Al-Hay is a town located in Iraq's Wasit Province. It 45 kilometers south of the Kut and 220 kilometers south of Baghdad. It has a population of 85,500 citizens.

External links
 Wasit province 

Populated places in Wasit Governorate
Cities in Iraq